The 1950–51 Allsvenskan was the 17th season of the top division of Swedish handball. 10 teams competed in the league. Örebro SK won the league, but the title of Swedish Champions was awarded to the winner of Svenska mästerskapet. Västerås IK and IFK Malmö were relegated.

League table

Attendance

References 

Swedish handball competitions